The 1977–78 season was Paris Saint-Germain's 8th season in existence. PSG mainly played their home league games at the Parc des Princes in Paris, but once at the Stade Bauer in Saint-Ouen-sur-Seine as well, registering an average attendance of 21,754 spectators per match. The club was presided by Daniel Hechter until January 1978, when Francis Borelli replaced him. The team was coached by player-manager Jean-Michel Larqué. Mustapha Dahleb was the team captain.

Summary

Jean-Michel Larqué, who had recently hung up his boots to become the new PSG manager in 1977–78, was quickly forced to put them back on to fill the void left by the failed transfer of Lyon playmaker Serge Chiesa. Larqué was the club's second and last player-manager to date, the other being Pierre Phelipon. For all the star signings, including Argentinian striker Carlos Bianchi and defenders Jean-Pierre Adams and Ramón Heredia, the season was a disappointing one as PSG finished in 11th place. Carlos Bianchi, for his part, was the top scorer in Division 1 with 37 goals in 38 matches. He was the last big transfer of Daniel Hechter.

In January 1978, Hechter was banned for life from football by the French Football Federation for running a ticketing scheme at Parc des Princes. PSG beat Marseille 5–1 in his final match at the stadium as club president on January 8. Mustapha Dahleb offered Hechter the match ball after the final whistle and was then carried in triumph by the players while the fans in attendance chanted his name. The next day, Francis Borelli, who had been vice-president until then, became the new president.

Players 

As of the 1977–78 season.

Squad

Out on loan

Transfers 

As of the 1977–78 season.

Arrivals

Departures

Kits 

French radio RTL was the shirt sponsor. American sportswear brand Pony was the kit manufacturer.

Friendly tournaments

Tournoi de Paris

Competitions

Overview

Division 1

League table

Results by round

Matches

Coupe de France

Round of 64

Round of 32

Statistics 

As of the 1977–78 season.

Appearances and goals 

|-
!colspan="16" style="background:#dcdcdc; text-align:center"|Goalkeepers

|-
!colspan="16" style="background:#dcdcdc; text-align:center"|Defenders

|-
!colspan="16" style="background:#dcdcdc; text-align:center"|Midfielders

|-
!colspan="16" style="background:#dcdcdc; text-align:center"|Forwards

|-
!colspan="16" style="background:#dcdcdc; text-align:center"|Players transferred out during the season

|-

References

External links 

Official websites
 PSG.FR - Site officiel du Paris Saint-Germain
 Paris Saint-Germain - Ligue 1 
 Paris Saint-Germain - UEFA.com

Paris Saint-Germain F.C. seasons
Association football clubs 1977–78 season
French football clubs 1977–78 season